Topeka (or ) is the capital city of the U.S. state of Kansas and the seat of Shawnee County.  It is along the Kansas River in the central part of Shawnee County, in northeast Kansas, in the Central United States.  As of the 2020 census, the population of the city was 126,587.  The Topeka metropolitan statistical area, which includes Shawnee, Jackson, Jefferson, Osage, and Wabaunsee Counties, had a population of 233,870 in the 2010 census.

The name "Topeka" is a Kansa-Osage word that means "place where we dig potatoes", or "a good place to dig potatoes". As a placename, Topeka was first recorded in 1826 as the Kansa name for what is now called the Kansas River. Topeka's founders chose the name in 1855 because it "was novel, of Indian origin, and euphonious of sound."  Mixed-blood Kansa Native American, Joseph James, called Jojim, is credited with suggesting Topeka's name. The city, laid out in 1854, was one of the Free-State towns founded by Eastern antislavery men immediately after the passage of the Kansas–Nebraska Bill. In 1857, Topeka was chartered as a city.

The city is well known for the landmark U.S. Supreme Court case Brown v. Board of Education of Topeka, which overturned Plessy vs. Ferguson and declared racial segregation in public schools to be unconstitutional.

History

Early history
For many millennia, Native Americans inhabited the Great Plains of North America. From the 16th to the mid-18th centuries, the Kingdom of France laid claim to large parts of North America. In 1762, late in the French and Indian War, France secretly ceded Louisiana west of the Mississippi River to Spain in the Treaty of Fontainebleau. In 1800, Spain returned Louisiana to France. In 1803, the United States purchased the territory, which included most of the land of modern Kansas, from France for $15 million.

19th century
During the 1840s and into the 1850s, travelers could reliably find a way across the river, but little else was in the area.

In the early 1850s, traffic along the Oregon Trail was supplemented by trade on a new military road stretching from Fort Leavenworth through Topeka to the newly established Fort Riley. In 1854, after completion of the first cabin, nine men established the Topeka Town Association. The group included Cyrus K. Holliday, an "idea man", who  became mayor of Topeka and founder of the Atchison, Topeka & Santa Fe Railroad. Soon, steamboats were regularly docking at the Topeka landing, depositing meat, lumber, and flour and returning eastward with potatoes, corn, and wheat. By the late 1860s, Topeka had become a commercial hub that offered many Victorian era comforts.

Topeka was a bastion for the free-state movement during the problems in Kansas Territory between abolitionist and proslavery settlers (the latter of whom controlled the legal government based out of Lecompton). After southern forces barricaded Topeka in 1856, Topeka's leaders took actions to defend the free-state town from invasion. A militia was organized and stone fortifications were built on Quincy Street. The fortifications seemed to consist of low-lying earthwork levies strengthened by the presence of at least one cannon. The militia manned the fortifications until at least September 1856, when the siege around the town was lifted.

After a decade of abolitionist and proslavery conflict that gave the territory the nickname Bleeding Kansas, Kansas was admitted to the Union in 1861 as the 34th state. Topeka was chosen as the capital, with Dr. Charles Robinson as the first governor. In 1862, Cyrus K. Holliday donated a tract of land to the state for the construction of a state capitol. Construction of the Kansas State Capitol began in 1866. About 37 years were needed to build the capitol, first the east wing, and then the west wing, and finally the central building, using Kansas limestone. In fall 1864, a stockade fort, later named Fort Simple, was built in the intersection of 6th and Kansas Avenues to protect Topeka, should Confederate forces then in Missouri decide to attack the city. It was abandoned by April 1865 and demolished in April 1867.

State officers first used the state capitol in 1869, moving from Constitution Hall, what is now 427-429 S. Kansas Avenue. Besides being used as the Kansas statehouse from 1863 to 1869, Constitution Hall is the site where antislavery settlers convened in 1855 to write the first of four state constitutions, making it the "Free State Capitol". The National Park Service recognizes Constitution Hall in Topeka as headquarters in the operation of the Lane Trail to Freedom on the Underground Railroad, the chief slave escape passage and free-trade road.

Although the drought of 1860 and the ensuing period of the Civil War slowed the growth of Topeka and the state, Topeka kept pace with the revival and period of growth Kansas enjoyed from the close of the war in 1865 until 1870. In the 1870s, many former slaves, known as Exodusters, settled on the east side of Lincoln Street between Munson and 12th Streets. The area was known as Tennessee Town because so many of them were from the Volunteer State. Dr. Charles Sheldon, pastor of the Central Congregational Church, organized the first African American kindergarten west of the Mississippi in 1893.

Lincoln College, now Washburn University, was established in 1865 in Topeka by a charter issued by the State of Kansas and the General Association of Congregational Ministers and Churches of Kansas. In 1869, the railway started moving westward from Topeka, where general offices and machine shops of the Atchison, Topeka & Santa Fe Railroad system were established in 1878.

During the late 1880s, Topeka passed through a boom period that ended in disaster. Vast speculation on town lots occurred. The 1889 bubble burst, and many investors were ruined. Topeka, however, doubled in population during the period, and was able to weather the depressions of the 1890s.

Early in the 20th century, another kind of boom, this time the automobile industry, took off, and numerous pioneering companies appeared and disappeared. Topeka was not left out. The Smith Automobile Company was founded there in 1902, lasting until 1912.

20th century

Home to the first African-American kindergarten west of the Mississippi River, Topeka was the home of Oliver Brown, the named plaintiff in Brown v. Board of Education, which was the case responsible for eliminating the standard of "separate but equal", and requiring racial integration in American public schools. In 1960, the Census Bureau reported Topeka's population as 91.8% White and 7.7% Black.

At the time the suit was filed, only the elementary schools were segregated in Topeka, and Topeka High School had been fully integrated since its inception in 1871. Furthermore, Topeka High School was the only public high school in the city of Topeka. Other rural high schools existed, such as Washburn Rural High School—created in 1918—and Seaman High School—created in 1920. Highland Park High School became part of the Topeka school system in 1959 along with the opening of Topeka West High School in 1961. A Catholic high school —Assumption High School, later renamed Capitol Catholic High School, then in 1939 again renamed, to Hayden High School after its founder, Father Francis Hayden — also served the city beginning in 1911.

Monroe Elementary, a segregated school that figured in the historic Brown v. Board of Education decision, through the efforts of the Brown Foundation working with the Kansas Congressional delegation place in the early 1990s, is now Brown v. Board of Education National Historic Site. The Brown Foundation is largely responsible for the content of the interpretive exhibits at the historic site. The National Historic Site was opened by President George W. Bush on May 17, 2004.

Topeka has struggled with the burden of racial discrimination even after Brown. New lawsuits attempted unsuccessfully to force suburban school districts that ring the city to participate in racial integration with the inner-city district. In the late 1980s, a group of citizens calling themselves the Task Force to Overcome Racism in Topeka formed to address the problem in a more organized way.

On June 8, 1966, Topeka was struck by a tornado rated F5 on the Fujita scale. It started on the southwest side of town, moving northeast, passing over a local landmark named Burnett's Mound. According to a local Indian legend, this mound was thought to protect the city from tornadoes if left undisturbed. A few years prior to the tornado strike, development began near the mound, including a water tank constructed near the top of the mound against the warnings of local Native Americans. The tornado went on to rip through the city, hitting the downtown area and Washburn University. Total repair cost was put at $100 million, making it, at the time, one of the most costly tornadoes in American history. Even to this day, with inflation factored in, the Topeka tornado stands as one of the most costly on record. It also helped bring to prominence future CBS and A&E broadcaster Bill Kurtis, who became well known for his televised admonition to "...take cover, for God's sake, take cover!" on WIBW-TV during the tornado. (The city is home of a National Weather Service Forecast Office that serves 23 counties in north-central, northeast, and east-central Kansas).

Topeka recovered from the 1966 tornado and has sustained steady economic growth. Washburn University, which lost several historic buildings, received financial support from the community and alumni to rebuild many school facilities. Today, university facilities offer more than one million square feet of modern academic and support space.

In 1974, Forbes Air Force Base closed and more than 10,000 people left Topeka, influencing the city's growth patterns for years to come. During the 1980s, Topeka citizens voted to build a new airport and convention center and to change the form of city government. West Ridge Mall opened in 1988, replacing the White Lakes Mall, which opened in 1964.

In 1989, Topeka became a motorsports mecca with the opening of Heartland Park Topeka. The Topeka Performing Arts Center opened in 1991. In the early 1990s, the city experienced business growth with Reser's Fine Foods locating in Topeka and expansions for Santa Fe and Hill's Pet Nutrition.

During the 1990s, voters approved bond issues for public school improvements, including magnet schools, technology, air conditioning, classrooms, and a sports complex. Voters also approved a quarter-cent sales tax for a new law-enforcement center, and in 1996, approved an extension of the sales tax for the East Topeka Interchange connecting the Oakland Expressway, K-4, I-70, and the Kansas Turnpike. During the 1990s, Shawnee County voters approved tax measures to expand the Topeka and Shawnee County Public Library. The Kansas Legislature and governor also approved legislation to replace the majority of the property tax supporting Washburn University with a countywide sales tax.

21st century
In 2000, the citizens again voted to extend the quarter-cent sales tax, this time for the economic development of Topeka and Shawnee County. In August, 2004, Shawnee County citizens voted to repeal the 2000 quarter-cent sales tax and replace it with a 12-year, half-cent sales tax designated for economic development, roads, and bridges. Each year, the sales tax provides $5 million designated for business development and job creation incentives, and $9 million for roads and bridges. Planning is under way to continue to redevelop areas along the Kansas River, which runs west to east through Topeka. In the Kansas River Corridor through the center of town, downtown Topeka has experienced apartment and condominium loft development, and façade and streetscape improvements.

Google, Kansas
On March 1, 2010, Topeka Mayor Bill Bunten issued a proclamation calling for Topeka to be known for the month of March as "Google, Kansas, the capital city of fiber optics." The name change came from Ryan Gigous, who wanted to "re-brand" the city with a simple gesture. This was to help "support continuing efforts to bring Google's fiber experiment" to Topeka, though it was not a legal name change. Lawyers advised the city council and mayor against an official name change. Google jokingly announced it would change its name to Topeka to "honor that moving gesture" on April 1, 2010 (April Fools' Day) and changed its home page to say Topeka. In its official blog, Google announced this change thus affected all of its services as well as its culture, e.g. "Googlers" to "Topekans", "Project Virgle" to "Project Vireka", and proper usage of "Topeka" as an adjective and not a verb, to avoid the trademark becoming genericized.

Geography

It is the origin of I-335 which is a portion of the Kansas Turnpike running from Topeka to Emporia, Kansas. US 40 is coincident with I-70 west from Topeka.

Climate
In 2007, Forbes named Topeka as one of the leading U.S. cities in terms of having the greatest variations in temperature, precipitation, and wind.
Topeka has a humid continental climate (Köppen climate classification Dfa), with hot, somewhat humid summers and cool to cold, fairly dry winters, and is in USDA plant hardiness zone 6a. The maximum temperature reaches  an average of 41.5 afternoons per year and reaches  an average of 3.5 afternoons per year. The minimum temperature falls below  an average of four mornings per year, and  21 afternoons per year stay below freezing. The average window for freezing temperatures is October 15 through April 17.

Generally, the spring and summer have the most rainfall, with autumn and winter being fairly dry. Much of the rainfall is delivered by thunderstorms. These can be severe, producing frequent lightning, large hail, and sometimes tornadoes. An average of 100 days of measurable precipitation occur per year. Winter snowfall is light, as is the case in most of the state, as a result of the dry, sunny weather patterns that dominate Kansas winters, which do not allow for sufficient moisture for significant snowfall. Winter snowfall averages . Measurable (≥) snowfall occurs an average of 12.9 days per year, with at least  of snow being received on five of those days. Snow depth of at least an inch occurs an average of 20 days per year.

Demographics

2010 census
As of the census of 2010, the city had 127,473 people, 53,943 households, and 30,707 families. The  59,582 housing units averaged . The city's racial makeup was 76.2% White, 11.3% African American, 1.4% Native American, 1.3% Asian, 4.8% from other races, and 4.9% from two or more races. Hispanics or Latinos of any race were 13.4% of the population. Non-Hispanic Whites were 69.7% of the population in 2010, down from 86.3% in 1970.

Of the 53,943 households, 29.5% had children under 18 living with them, 37.9% were married couples living together, 14.2% had a female householder with no husband present, 4.8% had a male householder with no wife present, and 43.1% were not families. About 35.9% of all households were made up of individuals, and 12% had someone living alone who was 65 or older. The average household size was 2.29, and the average family size was 2.99.

The city's age distribution was 24.4% under age 18, 9.8% from 18 to 24; 26.1%  from 25 to 44, 25.4% from 45 to 64, and 14.3%  were 65 or older. The median age in the city was 36 years. The city's gender makeup was 47.8% male and 52.2% female.

2000 census
As of the 2000 census, 122,377 people, 52,190 households, and 30,687 families were residing in the city. The city's racial makeup was 78.5% White, 11.7%  African American, 1.31% Native American, 1.09% Asian,  4.10% from other races, and 3.26% from two or more races. Hispanics or Latinos of any race were 8.9% of the population.

Of the 52,190 households,  28.0% had children under 18 living with them, 41.8% were married couples living together, 13.1% had a female householder with no husband present, and 41.2% were not families. About 35.0% of all households were made up of individuals, and 11.7% had someone living alone who was 65 or older. The average household size was 2.27, and the average family size was 2.94.

About 24.3% of the city's population was under age 18, 9.9% was from age 18 to 24, 28.9% was from age 25 to 44, 21.9% was from age 45 to 64, and 15.1% was age 65 or older. The median age was 36 years. For every 100 females, there were 92.4 males. For every 100 females age 18 and over, there were 88.4 males.

As of 2000, the city's median household income was $35,928, and the median family income was $45,803. Males had a median income of $32,373 versus $25,633 for females. The city's per capita income was $19,555. About 8.5% of families and 12.4% of the population were below the poverty line, including 16.7% of those under age 18 and 8.2% of those age 65 or over.

Crime

Although Topeka experienced problems with crime in the 1990s, the city's crime rates have improved since.  Overall, crime in Topeka was down nearly 18% in the first half of 2008, compared with the same period of 2007. Topeka police reported a 6.4% drop in crime from 2007 to 2008, including significant reductions in business robberies and aggravated assaults and batteries, as well as thefts.

On October 11, 2011, the Topeka city council agreed to repeal the ordinance banning domestic violence in an effort to force the Shawnee County District Attorney to prosecute the cases. Shawnee County District Attorney Chad Taylor said the DA "would no longer prosecute misdemeanors committed in Topeka, including domestic battery, because his office could no longer do so after county commissioners cut his budget by 10%." The next day, Taylor said his office would "commence the review and filing of misdemeanors decriminalized by the City of Topeka." The same day, 17% of the employees in the district attorney's office were announced to be laid off.

Religion

Topeka is sometimes cited as the home of Pentecostalism, as it was the site of Charles Fox Parham's Bethel Bible College, where glossolalia was first claimed as the evidence of a spiritual experience referred to as the baptism of the Holy Spirit in 1901. It is also the home of Reverend Charles Sheldon, author of In His Steps, and was the site where the famous question "What would Jesus do?" originated in a sermon of Sheldon's at Central Congregational Church.

The First Presbyterian Church in Topeka is one of the few churches in the U.S. to have its sanctuary completely decorated with Tiffany stained glass (another is St. Luke's United Methodist in Dubuque, Iowa; another is the Emmanuel Episcopal Church in Cumberland, Maryland).

The Roman Catholic population is large, and the city is home to nine Roman Catholic parishes, five of which feature elementary schools. Grace Cathedral of the Episcopal Diocese of Kansas is a large Gothic Revival structure in the city.

Topeka also has a claim in the history of the Baháʼí Faith in Kansas. Not only does the city have the oldest continuous Baháʼí community in Kansas (beginning in 1906), but the community also has roots to the first Baháʼí community in Kansas, in Enterprise, in 1897. This was the second Baháʼí community in the Western Hemisphere.

Topeka is home of the Westboro Baptist Church, a hate group according to the Southern Poverty Law Center. The church has garnered worldwide media attention for picketing the funerals of U.S. servicemen and women for what church members claim as "necessary to combat the fight for equality for gays and lesbians." They have sometimes successfully raised lawsuits against the city of Topeka. Across the street from them is the Equality House, a pro-LGBT home where volunteers of Planting Peace can stay. It is painted in rainbow colors and serves as a home for social workers caring for the LGBT+ community, directly opposite the property of the homophobic Westboro Baptist Church.

Economy

Being the state's capital city, Topeka's largest employer is the State of Kansas—employing about 8,400 people, or 69% of the city's government workers. Altogether, government workers make up one out of every five employed persons in the city.

The educational, health, and social services industry makes up the largest proportion of the working population (22.4%). The four school districts employ nearly 4,700 people, and Washburn University employs about 1,650. Three of the largest employers are Stormont-Vail HealthCare (with about 3,100 employees), St. Francis Health Center (1,800), and Colmery-O'Neil Veterans Administration Hospital (900).

The retail trade employs more than a tenth of the working population (11.5%) with Wal-Mart and Dillons having the greater share. Nearly another tenth is employed in manufacturing (9.0%). Top manufacturers include Goodyear Tire and Rubber Company, Hill's Pet Nutrition, Frito-Lay, and Jostens Printing and Publishing. Jostens announced plans in May 2012 to move production from its Topeka facility to Clarksville, Tennessee, affecting about 372 employee positions. Southwest Publishing & Mailing Corporation, a smaller employer, has its headquarters in Topeka.

Other industries are finance, insurance, real estate, and rental and leasing (7.8%); professional, scientific, management, administrative, and waste management services (7.6%); arts, entertainment, recreation, accommodation and food services (7.2%); construction (6.0%); transportation and warehousing, and utilities (5.8%); and wholesale trade (3.2%). Blue Cross and Blue Shield of Kansas is the largest insurance employer, with about 1,800 employees. BNSF Railway is the largest transportation employer, with about 1,100. Evergy employs nearly 800. About a tenth of the working population is employed in public administration (9.9%).

Major employers in Topeka include:

 BNSF Railroad
 Capitol Federal Savings Bank
 CoreFirst Bank & Trust
 Evergy, Inc.
 Frito-Lay
 Goodyear Tire and Rubber Company
 Hill's Pet Nutrition
 Sports Car Club of America
 Topeka Public Schools USD 501
 University of Kansas Health System
 Washburn University

Arts and culture

Arts
The Topeka Symphony Orchestra was founded in 1957. Topeka is home to broad areas of fine art.

Points of interest

 Brown v. Board of Education National Historic Site
 Evel Knievel Museum
 Kansas Children's Discovery Center in Gage Park
 Kansas State Capitol, with murals by John Steuart Curry, including the portrait of John Brown towering over "Bleeding Kansas" and the Kansas prairie, and topped with the sculpture of a native warrior named Ad Astra (from the state motto Ad Astra per Aspera, meaning "To the Stars Through Difficulty".)
 Kansas Expocentre and Landon Arena
 Combat Air Museum at Forbes Field
 Heartland Park Topeka, a major drag racing and road racing course just south of the city.
 Kansas Museum of History
 Reinisch Rose Garden and Doran Rock Garden, both parts of Gage Park.
 Topeka High School
 Topeka & Shawnee County Public Library
 Topeka Zoo, famous as the birthplace of the first golden eagle chick hatched in captivity and as the first zoo in the nation to have an indoor rain forest.
 Old Prairie Town at Ward-Meade Historic Site
 Washburn University, the last city-chartered university in the United States.
 Westboro Neighborhood
 Potwin Neighborhood, originally its own town, Potwin has now been surrounded by the City of Topeka, though it maintains its own mayor and traditions, including the Easter brunch and Fourth of July Parade.
 Kansas Judicial Center, where both the Supreme Court and Court of Appeals for the state sit.
 Cedar Crest, the Kansas Governor's Mansion on a hilltop overlooking the massive MacLennan Park.
 Great Overland Station, home of the Kansas Hall of Fame.
 The Upstage Gallery

Sports

Government

City

The current mayor of Topeka is Mike Padilla. The city manager is Stephen Wade. The city manager is responsible to the Topeka's City Council, which consists of the mayor and nine members elected from separate districts within the city. The city council members select the deputy mayor, Spencer Duncan, from among themselves. The deputy mayor chairs the Committee of the Whole and represents the City of Topeka at official functions whenever the mayor is unavailable. The city manager also guides the council through the meetings but cannot vote.

State

Education

Elementary and secondary education
Topeka is served by four public school districts, including:
 Topeka USD 501 (serving inner Topeka)
 Shawnee Heights USD 450  (serving east and southeast Topeka)
 Auburn–Washburn USD 437 (serving west and southwest Topeka)
 Seaman USD 345 (serving North Topeka)

Post-secondary education
Topeka has several colleges, universities, technical schools and branch campuses of other universities around the state. These include the following:
 Washburn University
 Friends University (Topeka Campus) 
 Washburn Institute of Technology 
 Baker University School of Nursing (Topeka Campus)
 University of Kansas Health Center (St. Francis Campus)
Rasmussen College (Topeka Campus)

Media

Print
Topeka is the home of a daily newspaper, the Topeka Capital-Journal; a bi-weekly newspaper, The Topeka Metro News; and the Topeka Metro Voice. A

Radio
The following radio stations are licensed to Topeka:

AM

FM

Additionally, most of the Kansas City stations provide at least grade B coverage of Topeka. KANU-FM in Lawrence (in the Kansas City market) serves as Topeka's NPR member station.

Television
The following television stations are licensed to Topeka:

Infrastructure

Transportation
I-70, I-470, and I-335 all go through the City of Topeka. I-335 is part of the Kansas Turnpike where it passes through Topeka. Other major highways include: US-24, US-40, US-75, and K-4. Major roads within the city include NW/SW Topeka Blvd. SW Wanamaker Road. N/S Kansas Ave. SW/SE 29th St. SE/SW 21st St. SE California Ave. SW Gage Blvd. and SW Fairlawn Rd.

Topeka Regional Airport (FOE) formerly known as Forbes Field is in south Topeka in Pauline, Kansas. Forbes Field also serves as an Air National Guard base, home of the highly decorated 190th Air Refueling Wing. Manhattan Regional Airport (MHK) in Manhattan, Kansas is the next closest commercial airport; Kansas City International Airport (MCI) in Kansas City is the closest major airport. Philip Billard Municipal Airport (TOP) is located in Topeka's Oakland area.

Passenger rail service provided by Amtrak stops at the Topeka Station. Service is via the Chicago-to-Los Angeles Southwest Chief during the early morning hours and makes intermediate stops at Lawrence and Kansas City. The Kansas Department of Transportation has asked Amtrak to study additional service, including daytime service to Oklahoma City. The Burlington Northern Santa Fe railroad and Union Pacific Railroad provide freight service as well as several short line railroads throughout the state.

Greyhound Lines provides bus service westward towards Denver, Colorado, eastward to Kansas City, Missouri, southwest to Wichita, Kansas.

The Topeka Metropolitan Transit Authority provides local transit service. The agency offers bus service from 6 am to 6:30 pm Monday through Friday, and 7 am to 5 pm on Saturday. It also provides demand response general public taxi service which operates evenings from 8 pm until 11:30 pm and on Sundays.

Utilities
 Electricity: Evergy
 Home telephone: AT&T and Cox
 Cable: Cox Communications and AT&T
 Satellite TV: Dish and DirecTV
 Gas: Kansas Gas Service
 Water and sewer: City of Topeka
 Sanitation: Shawnee County Waste Management
 Internet: Cox (cable), AT&T (fiber, DSL, and fixed wireless), and other providers.

Health care
Topeka has two major hospitals, Stormont-Vail and The University of Kansas Hospital - St. Francis Campus. Both are in central Topeka. Topeka is also home to the Colmery-O'Neil VA Medical Clinic and Topeka ER & Hospital.

Notable people

See also
 Great Flood of 1951
 1966 F5 tornado
 USS Topeka, 3 ships

Notes

References

Further reading

External links

 
 Topeka - Directory of Public Officials
 
 Topeka city map, KDOT

 
Cities in Kansas
Cities in Shawnee County, Kansas
County seats in Kansas
Populated places established in 1854
Topeka metropolitan area, Kansas
1854 establishments in Kansas Territory
Capitals of Kansas